An emasculator is a tool used in the castration of livestock. Its function is to simultaneously crush and cut the spermatic cord, preventing hemorrhaging while still detaching the testis from the animal.

The blade is always on the side of the emasculator with the nut that holds the blades in place, and should always be placed adjacent to the testis ("nut against nut") so that the crushing clamp occludes the spermatic artery, preventing life-threatening blood loss.

The ratchet (visible on the handle) allows the emasculator to be locked in the "closed" position for the 2–3 minutes required for primary hemostasis to occur.

The ends of the "clamp" are rounded and guarded to allow the emasculator to be placed over the testis and spermatic cord without cutting, until pressure is applied.

Types of emasculators

Emasculators can be divided into 2 categories
 Crushing
 Crushing and Cutting

Reimers Emascualtor has three actions: clamping, crushing and cutting. As the jaws are closed on the spermatic cord it is gripped by the clamping part. Back-lock retains the clamping part closed unless unlocked. The cutting lever works separately.

Veterinary castration
Veterinary equipment